Sir Andrew Buchanan, 1st Baronet, GCB, PC, DL (7 May 1807 – 12 November 1882) was a Scottish diplomat.

Family
Buchanan was the only son of James Buchanan of Blairvadach, Ardinconnal, Dumbartonshire, and Janet, the eldest daughter of James Sinclair, 12th Earl of Caithness.

He married first on 4 April 1839 Frances Katharine, the daughter of the Very Rev Edward Mellish, dean of Hereford (she died 4 December 1854). The children from this marriage were:
 Louisa Buchanan (d. 19 Jan 1923)
 Frances Matilda Buchanan (d. 13 Dec 1908)
 Sir James Buchanan, 2nd Baronet (7 Aug 1840 – 16 Oct 1901)
 Sir Eric Alexander Buchanan, 3rd Baronet (19 Aug 1848 – 29 Jul 1928)
 Andrew Archibald Buchanan (16 Jan 1850 – 5 Oct 1932)
Rt. Hon. Sir George William Buchanan (25 Nov 1854 – 20 Dec 1924)

Secondly, on 27 May 1857, Buchanan married Georgiana Eliza, the third daughter of Robert Walter Stuart, 11th Lord Blantyre. 

Buchanan was related to  Sir James Douglas

Career
Buchanan entered the diplomatic service 10 October 1825 and was attached to the embassy at Constantinople.

On 13 November 1830, he was named paid attaché at Rio de Janeiro, but he did not remain long in South America, as he served temporarily with Sir Stratford Canning's special embassy to Constantinople from 31 October 1831 to 18 September 1832. He later became paid attaché at Washington on 9 November. He was with Sir Charles Vaughan's special mission to Constantinople from March 1837 to September 1838 and then proceeded to St. Petersburg as paid attaché on 6 October 1838.

Few men seem to have gone through a greater number of changes in the diplomatic service; he was secretary of legation at Florence 24 August 1841 and chargé d'affaires from July 1842 to October 1843 and from March to May 1844. At Saint Petersburg he was secretary of legation 1844 and between that time and 1851 several times acted as chargé d'affaires. From 1852, he was for one year Minister Plenipotentiary to the Swiss Confederation.

In 1853, he was named envoy extraordinary to the king of Denmark, and he acted as her majesty's representative at the conference of Copenhagen in November 1855 for the definite arrangement of the Sound Dues question.

He had been appointed a Commander of the Order of the Bath (C.B.) o  23 May 1857, He was transferred to Madrid 31 March 1858 and promoted to Knight Commander (K.C.B.) 25 February 1860 and then to The Hague on 11 December 1860.

He became ambassador extraordinary and plenipotentiary to the King of Prussia 28 October 1862 for which he was sworn to the Privy Council. He served on the Privy Council on 3 February 1863. He was sent as Ambassador Extraordinary to Russia on 15 September 1864, raised to Knight Grand Cross (G.C.B.) on 6 July 1866 and made ambassador to Austria from 16 October 1871 to 16 February 1878, when he retired on a pension. He was created a baronet on 14 December 1878 and died at Craigend Castle, in Milngavie, near Glasgow.

Arms

Notes

References

External links

 http://www.thepeerage.com/p7984.htm#i79840

Biography and list of archive material relating to Sir Andrew Buchanan, held at Manuscripts and Special Collections at The University of Nottingham

1807 births
1882 deaths
Ambassadors of the United Kingdom to Austria
Baronets in the Baronetage of the United Kingdom
Ambassadors of the United Kingdom to Russia
Knights Grand Cross of the Order of the Bath
Members of the Privy Council of the United Kingdom
Ambassadors of the United Kingdom to Prussia
Ambassadors of the United Kingdom to Austria-Hungary
Ambassadors of the United Kingdom to Switzerland
Ambassadors of the United Kingdom of Great Britain and Ireland to Spain